The Happy Mess is a Portuguese indie pop band founded in 2011. The band consists of singer and guitarist Miguel Ribeiro, singer and keyboardist Joana Duarte, guitarist Zé Vieira, bassist João Pascoal, keyboardist Alfonso Carvalho and drummer Hugo Azevedo.

Career 
The Happy Mess was formed in 2011 and soon began releasing music with the release of their debut EP October Sessions. Three years later, they released their debut album Songs from the Backyard. In 2015, their second album Half Fiction gave them their first entry into the Portuguese sales chart entering the 20th place, beaten in 2018 by their follow-up album Dear Future, which reached the 14th position. In their career, The Happy Mess have performed on both national stages, touring Portugal, and internationally, such as the Eurosonic festival in the Netherlands.

Discography

Studio albums 
 2013 – Songs from the Backyard
 2015 – Half Fiction
 2018 – Dear Future
 2021 – Jardim da Parada

EP 
 2011 – October Sessions

Singles 
 2012 – Morning Sun
 2013 – Backyard Girl
 2013 – Homeland
 2015 – The Invisible Boy
 2016 – Revolução ao espelho
 2017 – Love Is a Strange Thing
 2018 – Waltz for Lovers (feat. Rita Redshoes)
 2018 – Long Goodbye
 2021 – Perder o pé
 2021 – Nadar de costas
 2021 – Alguma coisa va mudar

References 

Indie pop groups
Portuguese alternative rock groups
Musical groups established in 2011
2011 establishments in Portugal